Velichko Velichkov (Bulgarian Cyrillic: Величко Величков; born 24 November 1986) is a Bulgarian former professional footballer who played as a defender. His nickname is Crouch.

Career
Velichko Velichkov started his career in home town Elhovo in local team FC Stefan Karadzha. With this team he played three years in Bulgarian amateur division. Because of his good displays Velichkov caught eye of Botev scouts. As his contract with Karadzha expired in August 2006, he made a move to Botev Plovdiv with a free transfer.

Botev
Velichkov made his official debut for Botev in a match against CSKA Sofia on 1 October 2006. He played for 90 minutes. The result of the match was 1:0 with win for Botev. On 2 September 2007 he scored his first goal for Botev against Lokomotiv Sofia. He scored  goal in 66th minute for 2:1 for Botev. The result of the match was 2:2.

Sliven
In January 2009 Velichkov transferred to OFC Sliven 2000. He made his competitive debut on 21 March in a match against Slavia Sofia.

Gabala
Shortly before the 2010 transfer window closed, Velichkov signed a one-year contract with Gabala FC of the Azerbaijan Premier League.

Maritsa Plovdiv
On 10 June 2018, Velichkov joined Maritsa Plovdiv.

Career statistics

References

1986 births
Living people
People from Elhovo
Bulgarian footballers
Association football defenders
Botev Plovdiv players
OFC Sliven 2000 players
Gabala FC players
FC Lyubimets players
PFC Slavia Sofia players
Neftochimic Burgas players
New Radiant S.C. players
Victory Sports Club players
FC Maritsa Plovdiv players
FC Oborishte players
FC Lokomotiv Gorna Oryahovitsa players
First Professional Football League (Bulgaria) players
Second Professional Football League (Bulgaria) players
Azerbaijan Premier League players
Bulgarian expatriate footballers
Bulgarian expatriate sportspeople in Azerbaijan
Bulgarian expatriate sportspeople in the Maldives
Expatriate footballers in Azerbaijan
Expatriate footballers in the Maldives